Heliotropium strictum can refer to:

Heliotropium strictum Kunth, a synonym of Euploca humilis (L.) Feuillet
Heliotropium strictum Ledeb., a synonym of Heliotropium ellipticum Ledeb.